Events in the year 1917 in China.

Incumbents
President: Li Yuanhong
Vice President: 
 Feng Guozhang (June 7, 1916 – July 1)
 position abolished on July 1st
Premier: Duan Qirui

Events
Warlord Era
July 1–12 — Manchu Restoration: An attempt by monarchist general Zhang Xun to restore the Qing Dynasty

Births
 April 26 – Ieoh Ming Pei, main architect of the Louvre Pyramid (d. 2019)

 
1910s in China